Cycas siamensis is a species of cycad native to Myanmar, Thailand, and Vietnam.

Synonyms 
 Cycas baguanheensis L.K.Fu & S.Z.Cheng
 Cycas immersa Craib
 Cycas intermedia B.S.Williams
 Cycas siamensis subsp. siamensis
 Epicycas siamensis (Miq.) de Laub.

References 

 Bot. Zeitung (Berlin) 21: 334 1863.
 The Plant List
 The Cycad Pages

siamensis
Flora of Myanmar
Flora of Thailand
Flora of Vietnam
Vulnerable flora of Asia
Taxa named by Friedrich Anton Wilhelm Miquel
Plants described in 1863